Hennepin may refer to:

Places in the United States
Hennepin, Illinois, a village
Hennepin, Oklahoma, a small community
Hennepin Avenue, a street in Minneapolis, Minnesota
Hennepin County, Minnesota
Hennepin Township, Putnam County, Illinois

Other uses
Father Louis Hennepin (1626–1706), Belgian/French explorer of North America
SS Hennepin, a shipwreck off the coast of Lake Michigan near South Haven, Michigan, United States
USS Hennepin (AK-187) (1943–1946), US Navy cargo ship

See also